The Register of Historic Parks and Gardens of Special Historic Interest in England, created in 1983, is administered by Historic England.  It includes more than 1,600 sites, ranging from gardens of private houses, to cemeteries and public parks.

There are XXX registered parks and gardens in South East England. XX are listed at grade I, the highest grade, XX at grade II*, the middle grade, and XXX at grade II, the lowest grade.


Key

Parks and gardens

Berkshire

Buckinghamshire

East Sussex

Hampshire

Isle of Wight

Kent

Oxfordshire

Surrey

West Sussex

References

Notes

Listed parks and gardens in England
South East England